The Pan Africanist Socialist Movement-Inkinzo (MSP-Inkinzo)  is a small progressive, predominantly ethnic Tutsi political party in Burundi.

African socialist political parties
Pan-Africanist political parties in Africa
Political parties in Burundi
Political parties with year of establishment missing
Socialism in Burundi
Socialist parties in Africa